is a 1999 Japanese animated short film, directed by Mamoru Hosoda in his directorial debut. A part of the Digimon media franchise, Digimon Adventure is the first Digimon film, and serves as a prologue to the 1999 anime television series of the same name. The film was released in theaters in Japan on March 6, 1999, the day before the release of the Digimon Adventure television series.

Plot
In Tokyo, a creature hatches from an egg that emerges from a computer screen in the home of Taichi Yagami and his younger sister Hikari Yagami. Upon being cared for by the children, it transforms into a dinosaur-like creature that begins wandering the streets of the city. A second egg appears in the sky over Tokyo, from which a bird-like creature emerges. Taichi, Hikari, and several other children witness the two creatures fight; with Taichi and Hikari's encouragement, the dinosaur emerges victorious and both creatures vanish.

Cast

 Toshiko Fujita as Taichi Yagami
 Kae Araki as Hikari Yagami
 Chika Sakamoto as Koromon
 Yoshiko Sakakibara as Taichi's Mother
 Hiroya Ishimaru as Taichi's Father
 Yumi Tōma as Miko the Cat

Ai Nagano, Shoko Kikuchi, and Yū Sugimoto provide the voices of children.

Production

Digimon Adventure was directed by Mamoru Hosoda, written by Reiko Yoshida, and produced by Toei Animation. It is the first of two Digimon movies directed by Hosoda, preceding Digimon Adventure: Our War Game! (2000). The film was originally conceived as a standalone project based on the Digital Monster virtual pet created by WiZ and Bandai, with character designs by  that were inspired by 1970s comic book artwork. Following the launch of the manga series Digimon Adventure V-Tamer 01 in the manga magazine V Jump in 1998, Toei elected to make the manga's protagonist Taichi Yagami the primary character of Digimon Adventure; the film was ultimately re-developed into a prologue for the 1999 television series of the same name, which began production a month and a half after the film began production.

As he was unable to place the events of the film in the same time period as the 1990s-set Digimon Adventure television series without creating plot inconsistencies, Hosoda's original concept for the film was a story in which Taichi's father and his Digimon partner travel around Tokyo against the backdrop of the 1964 Summer Olympics; the proposal was rejected, and Hosoda was instead instructed to create a kaiju film. Faced with the difficulty of creating a kaiju film in the film's 20 minute length, Hosoda and Yoshida elected to focus principally on the film's climactic fight scene. Concerns around plot inconsistencies between film and television series were resolved by placing the events of the film several years before the events of the series.

Release
Digimon Adventure was released in theaters in Japan on March 6, 1999, a day before the release of the Digimon Adventure television series. It was released as part of the Spring 1999 Toei Animation Fair, alongside Yu-Gi-Oh! and Doctor Slump: Arale's Surprise Burn. A DVD collecting Digimon Adventure and Digimon Adventure: Our War Game! was released on October 13, 2000, for rental, and on January 21, 2001, for purchase.

The film's theme song is "Butter-Fly" by Koji Wada.

In North America, footage from Digimon Adventure was edited with footage from the films Digimon Adventure: Our War Game! (2000) and Digimon Adventure 02: Digimon Hurricane Landing!! / Transcendent Evolution!! The Golden Digimentals (2000) to create Digimon: The Movie, which was released in theaters on October 6, 2000.

Reception
Digimon Adventure, Yu-Gi-Oh! and Doctor Slump: Arale's Surprise Burn collectively grossed .

Producers of Gamera 3: Revenge of Iris which was released on the same day as Digimon Adventure, largely praised the Digimon film, and later noted in an interview that the film is inspiring and made them to realize that they should seek to create entertainments like Digimon Adventure.

Crunchyroll praised Digimon Adventure as an "endearing short film," praising Hosoda's "admirable" direction and storytelling in spite of the largely commercial purpose of the film. Writing for Polygon, Allegra Frank concurs that while the film is attached to a "Pokémon-like multimedia machine," it has "heart, and humor"; Chris Cimi of Otaquest similarly notes that while the film is "made to sell toys and games, Hosoda proved his aptitudes for resonance and charismatic visual story-telling clear as day."

References

External links

Kaiju films
1999 anime films
Anime short films
Digimon films
Films directed by Mamoru Hosoda
Films set in Japan
Japanese fantasy adventure films
Films set in 1995
Toei Animation films